The Political Film Society Award for human rights is given out each year to a film that deals with struggle for human rights in both fictional and non-fictional stories. This award has been handed out by the Society since 1987. Depending on the number of films that qualify, as few as one film has been nominated for this award before but as many as fourteen have been nominated in years past.

The film that first won this award was Matewan in 1987 that was directed by John Sayles. The award, as with any other Political Film Society Award, can go to a mainstream film, independent film, or even an international film. The Political Film Society looks at a broad selection of films before it nominates them for an award.

1980s
1987 Matewan
 Project X
1988 Cry Freedom
 The Accused
 A World Apart
1989 Mississippi Burning
 A Dry White Season
 Listen to Me
 Talk Radio

1990s
1990 Driving Miss Daisy
 Glory
 Longtime Companion
 Quigley Down Under
 Romero
1991 Boyz n the Hood
 Come See the Paradise
 Guilty by Suspicion
 Jungle Fever
 The Long Walk Home
1992 The Power of One
 Europa, Europa
 Sarafina!
 School Ties
 Thunderheart
1993 Schindler's List
 Dragon: The Bruce Lee Story
 Geronimo: An American Legend
 In the Name of the Father
 Indochine
 Orlando
 Philadelphia
1994 Go Fish
 On Deadly Ground
1995 Murder in the First
 Beyond Rangoon
 Picture Bride
 The Scarlet Letter
1996 Ghosts of Mississippi
 The Crucible
 Dead Man Walking
 Get on the Bus
 The People Vs. Larry Flynt
1997 Rosewood
 L.A. Confidential
 Midnight in the Garden of Good and Evil
 Seven Years in Tibet
1998 A Civil Action
Enemy of the State
The Siege
Wilde
1999 The Green Mile
Boys Don't Cry
The General's Daughter
Hard
Naturally Native
One Man's Hero
Three Kings
Xiu Xiu

2000s
2000 Remember the Titans
Before Night Falls
But I'm a Cheerleader
The Contender
Erin Brockovich
The Hurricane
It All Starts Today
Sunshine
X-Men
2001 Focus
Atlantis: The Lost Empire
Born Under Libra
Bread and Roses
The Closet
Greenfingers
The Hidden Half
The Iron Ladies
Journey to the Sun
Lumumba
2002 Ararat
Das Experiment
Evelyn
The Grey Zone
John Q
Rabbit-Proof Fence
To End All Wars
Tricky Life
2003 The Magdalene Sisters
Amen.
Beyond Borders
The Dancer Upstairs
Dirty Pretty Things
The Life of David Gale
Lilja 4-Ever
Sandstorm
The Statement
X2: X-Men United
2004 Hotel Rwanda
Carandiru
The Gatekeeper
Imagining Argentina
Moolaadé
The Motorcycle Diaries
Osama
The Sea Inside
Two Brothers (2004 film)
Vera Drake
The Yes Men
2005 North Country
Caché
The Constant Gardener
God's Sandbox
The Great Raid
The Great Water
In My Country
Innocent Voices
Machuca
The Ninth Day
The War Within
2006 The Last King of Scotland
Babel
Blood Diamond
Cautiva
Glory Road
The Road to Guantanamo
Sophie Scholl – The Final Days
2007 Amazing Grace
Bamako
Beyond the Gates
Charlie Wilson's War
Holly
The Hunting Party
In the Valley of Elah
Persepolis
Rendition
September Dawn
Southland Tales
Offside
2008 Milk
Battle in Seattle
The Boy in the Striped Pyjamas
Changeling
Hunger
Miracle at St. Anna
2009 District 9
American Violet
Avatar
The Cove
Fifty Dead Men Walking
Invictus
Punctured Hope
Skin
The Stoning of Soraya M.
Storm
The Yes Men Fix the World

2010s
2010 My Name Is Khan
Blood Done Sign My Name
Eichmann
Formosa Betrayed
The Ghost Writer
Green Zone
John Rabe
Made in Dagenham
Princess Ka'iulani
Shake Hands with the Devil
2011 The Help
5 Days of War
Amigo
City of Life and Death
The Conspirator
The Devil's Double
Elite Squad: The Enemy Within
The Flowers of War
In Darkness
Kinyarwanda
The Lady
Machine Gun Preacher
Oka!
Oranges and Sunshine
The Whistleblower
2012 West of Thunder
For Greater Glory
Mulberry Child
Red Tails
A Royal Affair
2013 Zaytoun
12 Years a Slave
42
The Butler
A Dark Truth
Out in the Dark
A River Changes Course
Wadjda
2014 César Chávez
Bhopal: A Prayer for Rain
Camp X-Ray
Coldwater
Devil's Knot
Difret
Free the Nipple
Giovanni's Island
The Imitation Game
The Monuments Men
Omar
Pride
The Railway Man
Rosewater
Siddhart
Unbroken
Walking with the Enemy
2015 Suffragette
Dukhtar
Freeheld
Labyrinth of Lies
Mustang
Noble
Son of Saul
Spotlight
The Danish Girl
The Stanford Prison Experiment
Stonewall
Straight Outta Compton
The 33
Timbuktu
Trumbo
Woman in Gold
2016 Loving
The Birth of a Nation
The Innocents
Race
Silence
2017 Marshall
13 Minutes
Alone in Berlin
Battle of the Sexes
Bitter Harvest
Brimstone
Detroit
The Divine House
In Dubious Battle
LBJ
The Post
The Promise
Trafficked
A United Kingdom
The Zookeeper's Wife
2018 BlacKkKlansman
Boy Erased
55 Steps
Freak Show
On the Basis of Sex
Sweet Country
2019
Ashes in the Snow
At War
Brian Banks
Capernaum
Clemency
Dark Waters
Go for Broke
Harriet
I Do Not Care If We Go Down in History as Barbarians
The Invisibles
Just Mercy
The Report
Richard Jewell
Seberg
Skin
Saint Judy

2020s
2020
The Banker
Burden
Sorry We Missed You
2021 Held for RansomAmerican Traitor
Betrayed
Blue Bayou
Flee
Hive
The Last Forest
The Trial of the Chicago 7
Wife of a Spy2022' TillArgentina, 1985DonbassEmancipationHoly SpiderLingui, the Sacred BondPursuit of FreedomShe SaidUnsilenced''

Sources
Political Film Society Previous Award Winners

See also
Political Film Society Award for Democracy
Political Film Society Award for Exposé
Political Film Society Award for Peace

Political Film Society
Awards established in 1987